Itzhak Mamistvalov is an Israeli Paralympic swimmer. Mamistvalov was born with cerebral palsy, and uses his right hand only when swimming. Classified S1, the class for swimmers with the most severe disabilities, he competes in S1 and S2 events.

Mamistvalov represented Israel at the 2004 Summer Paralympics in Athens, where he won two gold medals and one silver, and set two Paralympic records.

In August 2008, Mamistvalov was involved in a car accident. His car went off the road into a crowded bus stop and killed two people and also severely injured a third person, causing her to lose her right arm. Because of the accident he missed the 2008 Summer Paralympics. In July 2010 he was convicted of negligent homicide, but was spared of prison sentence because of his severe disability.

, Mamistvalov is IPC World Record holder in the S1 50m, 100m and 200m freestyle events.

References

External links
 

Living people
Israeli male swimmers
Paralympic swimmers of Israel
Swimmers at the 2004 Summer Paralympics
Swimmers at the 2012 Summer Paralympics
Paralympic gold medalists for Israel
Paralympic silver medalists for Israel
Paralympic bronze medalists for Israel
World record holders in paralympic swimming
Medalists at the 2004 Summer Paralympics
Medalists at the 2012 Summer Paralympics
Year of birth missing (living people)
Medalists at the World Para Swimming Championships
Medalists at the World Para Swimming European Championships
Paralympic medalists in swimming
S1-classified Paralympic swimmers